Eleni Zaude Gabre-Madhin (born 12 July 1964) is an Ethiopian-born Swiss economist, and former chief executive officer of the Ethiopia Commodity Exchange (ECX). She has had many years of experience working on agricultural markets – particularly in Sub-Saharan Africa – and has held senior positions in the World Bank, the International Food Policy Research Institute (Washington), and United Nations (Geneva).

Eleni Gebremedhn 
Eleni was born in Addis Ababa, Ethiopian Empire on 12 July 1964. She grew up in four different African countries including Kenya, Tanzania and South Africa. She speaks fluent Swahili, English, Amharic and French. She graduated from Rift Valley Academy in Kenya with the highest of honours. She has a PhD in Applied Economics from Stanford University, master's degrees from Michigan State University and bachelor's in economics from Cornell University. Eleni was selected as "Ethiopian Person of the Year" for the  calendar year (2009/2010 Gregorian) by the Ethiopian newspaper Jimma Times.

Career

She was the main driving force behind the development of the Ethiopia Commodity Exchange (ECX). Whilst working as a researcher for the International Food Policy Research Institute (IFPRI) she examined agricultural markets for many years and noticed, as had many others, that whilst in some years or regions there were severe shortages or droughts in others there were surpluses or bumper harvests. Specifically in her survey of grain traders in 2002, she found that a key factor was the lack of effective infrastructure and services needed for grain markets to function properly.  Traders often failed to have access to sufficient credit, information about the market, transportation and other vital resources and contract compliance was difficult to enforce.  In 2004 she moved home from the US to lead an IFPRI program to improve Ethiopia's agricultural policies and markets. Specifically she undertook the important role of coordinating the advisory body developing the ECX.   She became CEO of the new exchange in 2008, and argued that "(W)hen farmers can sell their crops on the open market and get a fair price, they will have much more incentive to be productive, and Ethiopia will be much less prone to food crises" .... and that the "ECX will allow farmers and traders to link to the global economy, propelling Ethiopian agriculture forward to a whole new level."

In February 2013, she became a director of Syngenta.

In 2013, Eleni launched eleni LLC, a company intended to build and invest in commodity exchanges in markets in the developing world, including Africa.

In November 2021, the Canadian novelist Jeff Pearce leaked a video that depicts Eleni's participation in a virtual meeting discussion, along with Professor Ephraim Isaac, former Ethiopian Minister of Foreign Affairs and current TPLF spokesperson Berhane Gebre-Christos and several Western diplomats, that mentioned a transitional government during Tigray War. Shortly, she was removed from membership of the Independent Economic Council, which formed to support Prime Minister Abiy Ahmed economic transition.  On 25 November, Eleni released a statement that denying the allegation as "deliberately misrepresented". Two days before the leaked video unveiled, police forces searched her house and remained undisclosed for suspected foul play.  The incident stirred public outrage in Ethiopia and its diaspora, condemning her as traitor. The University of Gondar also revoked an honorary doctorate it had awarded her.

Awards 

In 2010, Eleni was named Ethiopian Person of the Year for the 2002 Ethiopian year. Eleni was listed as one of the 50 Women Shaping Africa in 2011.

In 2012, Eleni was awarded the Yara Laurate Prize from the Norwegian fertilizer manufacturer Yara International for her outstanding contributions to sustainable food production and distribution with socio-economic impact. Previous recipients of the prize include former prime minister of Ethiopia Meles Zenawi. That same year, she was recognized as one of New African Magazine's 100 Most Influential Africans, won the African Banker Icon Award, and invited to the G8 Summit at Camp David.

She was granted The Power with Purpose Award from Devex and McKinnsey in 2016.

Formerly, Eleni Gabre-Madhin received an honorary doctorate, in 2013, from the University of Gondar in Ethiopia. However, later in November 2021, the University of Gondar revoked the Honorary Doctorate of Eleni Gabre-Madhin in relation to her involved clandestine video meeting aimed at toppling the democratically elected government of Ethiopia.

References

External links 
 
 "A commodities exchange for Ethiopia" (TEDGlobal 2007)
 Ethiopia Commodity Exchange

1964 births
Living people
Ethiopian economists
Swiss people of Ethiopian descent
Cornell University alumni
Stanford University alumni